"Stan Bowles" is a song by English indie rock band The Others and is featured on their debut album, The Others. Released on 18 October 2004, it was the second single from the album and charted at number 36 on the UK Singles Chart. The lyrics concern footballer Stan Bowles.

Track listing
 "Stan Bowles" 
 "Boy Is a Girl"  
 "This Is for the Poor" (Original Demo)

References

2004 singles
The Others (band) songs
2004 songs
Song articles with missing songwriters
Mercury Records singles